Kaliyuga Seethe is a 1992 Indian Kannada-language romantic drama film directed by Vijay and written by M. D. Sundar. The film stars Malashri, Sunil with Srinivasa Murthy, Sudheer and Lohithaswa in key supporting roles.

The film's music was composed by Rajan–Nagendra and the audio was launched on the Lahari Music banner.

Cast 

Malashri 
Sunil
Srinivasa Murthy
Avinash
Lohithaswa
Sudheer
Balakrishna
M. S. Umesh
Shivakumar
Tennis Krishna
Sihi Kahi Chandru
Bhagyashri
Vanishri

Soundtrack 
The music of the film was composed by Rajan–Nagendra and lyrics written by Chi. Udaya Shankar.

References 

1992 films
1990s Kannada-language films
Indian romantic drama films
Films scored by Rajan–Nagendra
1992 romantic drama films
Films directed by Vijay (director)